The Andean white-eared opossum (Didelphis pernigra) is an opossum species from South America. It is found in the Andes Mountains, ranging from Venezuela to Bolivia.

Together with the Guianan white-eared opossum (D. imperfecta), this species was separated from the white-eared opossum (D. albiventris) in 2002, having been included with that species in 1993.

References

External links
Mamíferos del ecuador

Opossums
Marsupials of South America
Mammals of the Andes
Mammals of Bolivia
Mammals of Colombia
Mammals of Ecuador
Mammals of Peru
Mammals of Venezuela
Mammals described in 1900